The Society of Divine Vocations abbreviated S.D.V., also commonly known as the Vocationists, is a Roman Catholic clerical religious congregation of Pontifical Right for men (Priests and Brothers) founded by Fr. Giustino Russolillo (1891-1955) in Italy on October 18, 1920. The Vocationist Fathers have their motherhouse at Pianura, which is in the Province of Naples in Italy. Its members add the nominal letters S.D.V. after their names to indicate their membership in the society.

Description
The Vocationist Fathers has its main charism as “identifying and fostering vocations to priesthood and religious life, especially among the less privileged”. The Vocationists work in Vocationaries (considered as their most characteristic work and most special and primary field of action), parishes, schools, and missions. Currently, the Society of Divine Vocations in her missionary spirit serves the people of God in Italy, Brazil, U.S.A., Argentina, Nigeria, Philippines, India, Madagascar, Colombia, Ecuador, Indonesia, United Kingdom, and Chile.

The Society of Divine Vocation is a religious institute of Pontifical Right. They live in communities and profess the three evangelical counsels of Poverty, Chastity and Obedience while majoring the work of Vocation. The Vocationist Fathers believe themselves to be specially called by God as vocation experts, counselors and midwives in the Church. Their work is to help people discern properly and answer the call of God in their lives.

By the reality of their vocation-oriented charism, a “Vocationist”, a name given to them by their founder, Fr. Giustino Russolillo, and coined from the word “Vocation”, is one who has an exceptional love for vocation, one who is a specialist in caring for vocations, one who dedicates his life to vocations, and one who is committed to working and praying for vocations. According to Fr. Giustino, other religious institutes wait for vocations and welcome them, while the Vocationists, personally and purposely, go out searching for them, especially through their  catechetical schools and other apostolates. In other words, their activities are highly riveted on matters of vocation and in all, their immediate objective, though not their goal, is to see people being guided to properly discern their vocations and being helped to realize them by responding appropriately to God's call in their lives. Their ultimate goal is to help all attain Divine Union with the Blessed Trinity by means of universal sanctification of all souls.

See also
 St Winefride's Church, Holywell
 St Mary's Church, Walsall
 Our Lady Queen of Apostles Church, Heston

References

Christianity in Naples
Catholic orders and societies
Religious organisations based in Italy